The Illyrian deciduous forests is a terrestrial ecoregion in southern Europe, which extends along the eastern coast of the Adriatic Sea. It belongs to the Mediterranean forests, woodlands, and scrub biome, and is in the Palearctic realm.

Geography
The Illyrian deciduous forests stretch along the eastern coast of the Ionian and Adriatic Seas, and occupies  in Northern Greece, Albania, Montenegro, Bosnia and Herzegovina, Croatia, Slovenia and Northern Italy around Trieste.

The ecoregion is bounded by the Aegean and Western Turkey sclerophyllous and mixed forests (in Greece), Pindus Mountains mixed forests (in Greece and Albania), Dinaric Mountains mixed forests (in Albania, Montenegro, Bosnia and Herzegovina, Croatia, Slovenia and Italy) and Po Basin mixed forests (in Italy).

Climate
The climate of the ecoregion is mostly of Köppen's Mediterranean type with hot summers (Csa) to humid subtropical with wet winters (Cfa).

Flora
Due to the wide altitudinal range of this ecoregion the highest elevations (above ) are covered with conifer forests, with a mixed broadleaf vegetation and maquis shrubland occurring lower. The conifer zone is dominated by the Norway spruce, silver fir, European black pine, in some places Bosnian pine with the admixture of the European beech. The dominant species of the lower zones include various deciduous oaks Quercus frainetto, Q. pubescens, Q. cerris, Quercus trojana, Quercus macrolepis, Carpinus orientalis, Fraxinus ornus with Cotinus coggygria, Paliurus spina-christi, Cercis siliquastrum. Evergreen trees and maquis shrubs Quercus ilex, Quercus coccifera, Pinus halepensis, Pinus pinea, Pistacia terebinthus, P. lentiscus, Erica arborea, Juniperus oxycedrus, J. macrocarpa, Olea europaea, Arbutus unedo, A. andrachne, Nerium oleander become predominant near the coast.

Ecoregion delineation
The Illyrian deciduous forests ecoregion is delineated by the WWF and Digital Map of European Ecological Regions by the European Environment Agency.
Phytogeographically, the ecoregion is shared between the Adriatic and East Mediterranean provinces of the Mediterranean Region within the Holarctic Kingdom (according to Armen Takhtajan's delineation).

External links

References

Mediterranean forests, woodlands, and scrub
Ecoregions of Albania
Ecoregions of Bosnia and Herzegovina
Ecoregions of Croatia
Ecoregions of Europe
Ecoregions of Greece
Ecoregions of Italy
Ecoregions of Montenegro
Ecoregions of Slovenia
Environment of the Balkans

Palearctic ecoregions
Ecoregions of the Mediterranean Basin